Dattilo is a surname. Notable people with the surname include:

Bryan Dattilo (born 1971), American actor, brother of Bryan
Kristin Dattilo (born 1970), American actress
Nicholas C. Dattilo (1932–2004), American Roman Catholic bishop